Zamostochye or Zamastočča is a township in Belarus. It is located in Minsk District, 20 km (12.5 mi) southeast of Minsk. In 2010, its population was 2,310.

References

External links
 

Towns in Belarus
Populated places in Minsk Region
Minsk District